These are the most popular given names in the United States for all years of the 1920s.

1920 

Males
John
William
James
Robert
Joseph
Charles
George
Edward
Thomas
Frank

Females
Mary
Dorothy
Helen
Margaret
Ruth
Virginia
Elizabeth
Anna
Mildred
Betty

1921 

Males
John
Robert
James
William
George
Charles
Joseph
Edward
Frank
Thomas
Females
Mary
Dorothy
Helen
Margaret
Ruth
Mildred
Betty
Virginia
Elizabeth
Anna

1922 
Males
John
Robert
James
William
Joseph
Charles
George
Edward
Richard
Frank
Females
Mary
Dorothy
Helen
Margaret
Ruth
Betty
Frances
Elizabeth
Virginia
Anna

1923 

Males
John
Robert
William
James
Charles
George
Joseph
Edward
Frank
Richard
Females
Mary
Dorothy
Helen
Margaret
Betty
Ruth
Mildred
Virginia
Frances
Elizabeth

1924 

Males
John
Robert
James
William
Charles
Joseph
George
Edward
Richard
Donald
Females
Mary
Dorothy
Helen
Betty
Margaret
Ruth
Virginia
Frances
Doris
Mildred

1925 

Males
John
Robert
James
William
Charles
Joseph
George
Richard
Edward
Donald
Females
Mary
Dorothy
Betty
Helen
Margaret
Ruth
Doris
Virginia
Elizabeth
Evelyn; Mildred (tie)

1926 

Males
Robert
John
William
James
Charles
George
Richard
Joseph
Edward
Donald
Females
Mary
Dorothy
Helen
Betty
Margaret
Ruth
Virginia
Doris
Jean
Maria

1927 

Males
Robert
James
John
William
Charles
Richard
George
Joseph
Donald
Edward
Females
Mary
Betty
Dorothy
Helen
Margaret
Ruth
Virginia
Doris
Maria
Shirley

1928 

Males
Robert
John
James
William
Charles
Richard
Donald
George
Joseph
Edward
Females
Mary
Betty
Dorothy
Helen
Margaret
Ruth
Barbara
Doris
Maria
Patricia

1929 

Males
Robert
John
James
William
Charles
Donald
Richard
George
Joseph
Edward
Females
Mary
Betty
Dorothy
Helen
Margaret
Ruth
Doris
Maria
Barbara
Shirley

References 
 Most Popular 1000 Names of the 1920s from the Social Security Administration

1920s
1920s in the United States